The 2021 UAB Blazers football team represented the University of Alabama at Birmingham during the 2021 NCAA Division I FBS football season. The Blazers played their home games at the newly opened Protective Stadium in Birmingham, Alabama, and competed in the West Division of Conference USA (CUSA). The team was coached by sixth-year head coach Bill Clark.

Previous season

The Blazers finished the 2020 regular season 6–3 and 3–1 in C–USA play to finish first in the West Division. They competed in the conference championship game for a record third consecutive year and won their second title in three years.

Schedule 
UAB announced its 2021 football schedule on January 27, 2021. The 2021 schedule consisted of 5 home and 6 away games in the regular season, as well as 1 neutral site game.

References

UAB
UAB Blazers football seasons
Independence Bowl champion seasons
UAB Blazers football